Slikių Geležinkelio Stotis ('Slikiai railway station') is a railway station settlement in Kėdainiai district municipality, in Kaunas County, in central Lithuania. According to the 2001 census, the settlement had a population of 18 people. There is the Lukšiai railway station by the Vilnius-Šiauliai-Klaipėda line.

Demography

Images

References

Villages in Kaunas County
Kėdainiai District Municipality